Oakengates Market Street railway station was a station in Oakengates, Shropshire, England. The station was opened in 1860 and closed in 1952. The station was demolished after closure and the site is now occupied by the A442.

References

Further reading

Disused railway stations in Shropshire
Railway stations in Great Britain opened in 1860
Railway stations in Great Britain closed in 1952
Former London and North Western Railway stations